Zhou Bangyan (1056–1121) was a Chinese bureaucrat, literatus and ci poet of the Northern Song Dynasty. He was from Qiantang (in modern Hangzhou). His courtesy name was Meicheng, and his art name was Qingzhen Jushi. He left a two-volume poetry anthology called either the Qingzhen-ji or the Pianyu-ci.

Biography

Birth and early life 
Zhou Bangyan was born in 1056. He was a native of Qiantang (錢塘/钱塘 Qiántáng, modern-day Hangzhou, Zhejiang Province).

Political career 
At the age of 23, Zhou went to live in the capital Bianliang as a student at the National Academy. In 1083 he published "Rhapsody on the capital" (汴都賦 Biandu fu), which described the bustle of Bianliang while also praising the Song dynasty's accomplishments. The poem pleased Emperor Shenzong, and Zhou was appointed Supervisor at the National Academy (太學正/太学正 taixuezheng).

In 1087, at the age of 31, Zhou was sent to Lu Prefecture in Anhui where he worked as an instructor (教授). He stayed in the provinces for ten years, mostly as Sub-prefect of Lishui County in Jiangsu, before Emperor Zhezong recalled him in 1097 to be Registrar of the National Academy (國子主簿). He found favour with Emperor Zhezong and his successor Emperor Huizong, and thereafter rose through the ranks in the central government. He left the capital in 1112 to serve as Prefect of Longde-fu (隆德府, in the area of present-day Changzhi) and Mingzhou (明州), before returning in 1116 to become Director of the Palace Library (秘書監), the highest position he received.

Later life and death 
In 1118 Zhou was again assigned a prefectural post. After three transfers, he died in Nanjing (present-day Shangqiu) in 1121, aged 66.

Names 
His courtesy name was Meicheng, and his art name was Qingzhen Jushi.

Works 
Zhou is especially famous as a composer of ci, a form of poetry that began in the Tang era and flourished during the Song Dynasty. His complex and elegant poetic style is noted for its polished and elaborate form, and has been praised as "simple and honest, and elegant" (渾厚和雅). His two-volume poetry anthology is called the Qingzhen-ji (清真集) or the Pianyu-ci (片玉詞).

Zhou was a noted composer of tunes and lyrics, working in close association with the imperial Music Bureau (大晟府 Dashengfu), which presided over court music. He was a proficient musician, and set many of his own poems to music.

Reception 
He became known as the "Patriarch of Ci Poets" (詞家正宗), and is listed along with Liu Yong, Xin Qiji and Jiang Kui as the "Four Great Ci Poets". His poetry served as a model for ci poets of later eras, with many imitators among the Southern Song literati. One example is the He Qingzhen-ci (和清真詞) by Fang Qianli (方千里).

Chen Yuanlong (陳元龍) of the Southern Song composed a ten-volume commentary on his poetry entitled Pianyu-ji (片玉集).

Notes

References

Works cited 
 
 
 
 
 
 

1056 births
1121 deaths
Writers from Hangzhou
Politicians from Hangzhou
Song dynasty poets
Song dynasty politicians from Zhejiang
11th-century Chinese musicians